Juan López Turró (9 May 1892 in Barcelona – unknown) was a Spanish footballer who played as a forward. Short and thin, he stood out for his effective play, having little formality to put the ball in the back of the net. His best years were in the second half of the 1910s, where he was an undisputed starter at Espanyol and a regular with the Catalan national team.

Club career
Born in Barcelona, he began to play football at the youth ranks of Espanyol in 1905, reaching the first team in 1909, where he played for 8 seasons, featuring alongside Ricardo Zamora in his last season at the club, and being pivotal in helping Espanyol reach the 1915 Copa del Rey Final, which they lost 0-5 to Athletic Bilbao. He then joined Universitary SC in 1917, with whom he played for just one year, returning to Espanyol at the end of the season in 1918, for whom he played until 1922.

He rarely went to the playing field unless there was a game, meaning he almost never trained, which wasn't uncommon in those times, but despite that, he became one of the most emblematic players of his time.

International career
Being a Espanyol player, he was summoned to play for the Catalonia national team several times, and in May 1916, he was a member of the Catalan team that won the second edition of the Prince of Asturias Cup in 1916, an inter-regional competition organized by the RFEF.

Honours

Club
Espanyol
Copa del Rey:
Runner-up (1): 1915

International
Catalonia
Prince of Asturias Cup:
Champions (1): 1916

References

1892 births
Footballers from Barcelona
Spanish footballers
RCD Espanyol footballers
Association football defenders
Catalonia international footballers